George Bayly (17 March 1856 – 26 June 1938) was a New Zealand cricketer. He played eight first-class matches for Taranaki between 1882 and 1898.

Newington College
George, and his brother Fred Bayly, sailed across the Tasman to attend school at Newington College in 1874 and 1875. Both brothers played in Newington's 1st XV Rugby and 1st XI cricket teams.

Rugby union
Bayly was one of the best rugby players on the Taranaki club scene and in representative rugby. As a representative player he appeared in several games from 1876 to 1883 for the Hawera club. In 1879, he played two games for the Wellington district XV, scoring a try and a goal. He became President of the Taranaki Rugby Union in 1889 and held that position until 1898, when he was elected as President of the New Zealand Rugby Union.

Grazier
Bayly became a sheep farmer at Mollison near Hāwera. He died at Stanmore Bay, Auckland, aged 82.

See also
 List of Taranaki representative cricketers

References

External links
 

1856 births
1938 deaths
New Zealand cricketers
Taranaki cricketers
Cricketers from New Plymouth
People educated at Newington College